Mindy Marin (born February 15, 1960 in Greenwich, Connecticut) is a casting director, producer and writer based in Santa Monica, California.

Casting
Marin is predominantly known for her casting in film and television. This career path began at Paramount Television in 1978 as a casting assistant for Taxi.  Subsequently she worked at Warner Bros. for four years, ultimately becoming the Manager of Talent and Casting. In 1989 Marin left to establish her own company, Casting Artists, Inc.
She has cast 70 films including Cliffhanger, Clear and Present Danger, Face/Off, Juno, and Thank You for Smoking, which she also co-produced. She has been nominated for four Artios awards and one Emmy.

Producing
In 1991 Marin founded the production company Bluewater Ranch Entertainment and in 1996 the film 2 days in the valley was released, marking her first production working as an associate producer. She has also been an associate producer on The Deep End, a co-producer on Thank You for Smoking, The Family Stone, and The Alibi, and an executive producer on Night at the Golden Eagle.

Writing
In addition to Bluewater Ranch Entertainment Marin, founded Bluewater Ranch Books, in 1991. She wrote The Secret to Tender Pie, a book containing favorite recipes of grandmothers from across the country, including her own. It is in this book that her grandmother—Bessie Cecil—included her secret apple pie recipe. Published by Random House Value Publishing (Pub date: November 17, 1998), it debuted on the Los Angeles Times Bestseller List and received positive reviews from nationwide media.

Filmography (casting)

Films
 Mission: Impossible – Fallout (2018)
 Into The Storm (2014)
 The Hangover Part III (2013)
 Jack Reacher (2012)
 Abraham Lincoln: Vampire Hunter (2012)
 Crazy, Stupid, Love (2011)
 Drive (2011)
 The Book of Eli (2010)
 Up in the Air (2009)
 Tooth Fairy (2009)
 Jennifer's Body (2009)
 9 (2009)
 Repossession Mambo (2009)
 The Day the Earth Stood Still (2008)
 Max Payne (2008)
 The X-Files: I Want to Believe (2008)
 Wanted (2008)
 Juno (2007)
 Aliens vs. Predator: Requiem (2008)
 Alvin and the Chipmunks (2007)
 Mr. Brooks (2007)
 Whatever Lola Wants (2007)
 Eragon (2006)
 Flicka (2006)
 Lies & Alibis (2006)
 Snakes on a Plane (2006)
 Thank You for Smoking (2006)
 The Covenant (2006)
 The Nativity Story (2006)
 Bee Season (2005)
 Lord of War (2005)
 Revolver (2005)
 The Family Stone (2005)
 Alfie (2004)
 Dirty Dancing: Havana Nights (2004)
 Bulletproof Monk (2003)
 Open Range (2003)
 Paycheck (2003)
 Swimfan (2002)	
 The First $20 Million Is Always the Hardest (2002)
 The Sum of All Fears (2002)
 The Touch (2002)
 Time Machine (2002)
 Windtalkers (2002)
 15 Minutes (2001)
 Night at the Golden Eagle (2001)
 The Deep End (2001)
 Chain of Fools (2000)
 Lost Souls (2000)
 My Dog Skip (2000)
 Crazy in Alabama (1999)
 Mystery Men (1999)
 The General's Daughter (1999)
 Dangerous Beauty (1998)
 Soldier (1998)
 Anaconda (1997)
 Face/Off (1997)
 The Postman (1997)
 2 Days in the Valley (1996)
 Cutthroat Island (1995)
 The Net (1995)
 Clean Slate (1994)
 Clear and Present Danger (1994)
 Cliffhanger (1993)
 So I Married An Axe Murderer (1993)
 Flight of the Intruder (1991)
 L.A. Story (1991)
 Necessary Roughness (1991)
 Talent for the Game (1991)
 The Naked Gun 2½: The Smell of Fear (1991)
 Chattahoochee (1990)
 The First Power (1990)
 Miss Firecracker (1989)
 Next of Kin (1989)
 Bad Dreams (1988)
 Betrayed (1988)

Television
 Path to War (2002)
 Holiday Heart (2000)
 Tuesdays with Morrie (1999)
 When Trumpets Fade (1998)
 If These Walls Could Talk (1996)
 Nash Bridges (1995–2001)
 Kingfish: A Story of Huey P. Long (1995)
 Open Window	(1991)
 Our Sons (1991)
 Peacemaker (1991)
 The Astronomer (1991)
 In Living Color (1990–1991)
 A Deadly Silence (1989)
 Ohara (1987)
 Head of the Class (1986)
 Maggie (1986)
 Shadow Chasers (1985)

Filmography (producer)

Films
 Thank You for Smoking Co-Producer (2006)
 The Family Stone Co-Producer (2005)
 Lies & Alibis Co-Producer (2006)
 Night at the Golden Eagle Executive Producer (2001)
 The Deep End Associate Producer (2001)
 2 Days in the Valley	Associate Producer (1996)

References

External links
Marin's company website

Backstage West article "All the World" by Anne Kelly Saxenmeyer discussing the life and career of Mindy Marin
The inbasline comprehensive list of casting and producing for of Mindy Marin
Hollywood.com list of filmography and TV credits for Mindy Marin
Mindy's book The Secret to Tender Pie reviewed on Amazon.com
Malibu Times Magazine article "Casting Light from Malibu" featuring Mindy Marin

1960 births
Writers from Greenwich, Connecticut
American casting directors
Women casting directors
Living people
Film producers from Connecticut